Sultan Ismail Petra ibni Almarhum Sultan Yahya Petra (11 November 1949 – 28 September 2019) was the 28th Sultan of Kelantan and the 11th Sultan of Modern Kelantan  who reigned from 30 March 1979 to 13 September 2010. He succeeded on the death of his father, Sultan Yahya Petra. He died at the Royal Ward Raja Perempuan Zainab II Hospital in Kota Bharu on 28 September 2019, aged 69, after 10 years of suffering from a massive stroke and was buried at the Kelantan Royal Mausoleum. He was succeeded by his eldest son, Sultan Muhammad V who ascended the throne on 13 September 2010.

Early life

Sultan Ismail Petra was born at Istana Jahar, Kota Bharu, Kelantan on 19 Muharam 1369 Hijrah, corresponding to Friday 11 November 1949. He was the youngest child and only son of Sultan Yahya Petra by his wife, Raja Perempuan Zainab II. He grew up with four elder siblings, namely, Tengku Merjan, Tengku Rozan, Tengku Salwani and Tengku Rohani.

Sultan Ismail Petra received his secondary education at Maktab Sultan Ismail, Kota Bharu before being tutored by a special English Language teacher.

On 8 January 2002, he was conferred an Honorary Doctorate of Philosophy in Political Science from the Ramkhamhaeng University, Thailand.

Crown Prince and Regent of Kelantan

Sultan Ismail Petra was made as the Crown Prince (Tengku Mahkota) of Kelantan on 11 November 1967 at Istana Balai Besar, Kota Bharu, Kelantan.

He was also appointed as the Regent (Pemangku Raja) of Kelantan when his father was elected as King (Yang di-Pertuan Agong) of Malaysia from 21 September 1975 until his death on 29 March 1979.

Career 
In 1967, Sultan Ismail Petra's career started when he worked in administration as an officer, working for a period of a year at the Kelantan State Secretary Office in Kota Bharu and a year later at the Land and District Office in Kota Bharu.

Sultan of Kelantan
Sultan Ismail Petra succeeded his father as the Sultan of Kelantan on 30 March 1979. A year later, on 30 March 1980, he was crowned as the Sultan of Kelantan at Throne Room of the Istana Balai Besar, Kota Bharu.

Military
Sultan Ismail Petra was commissioned as the Honorary Royal of the rank of major in the Territorial Army Regiment on 1 November 1974. Two years later, he was elevated to lieutenant colonel. On 15 March 1988, he was appointed Honorary Lieutenant Colonel in the Territorial Army Regiment. In 1997, he was appointed Honorary Major-General & Colonel-in-Chief of the Royal Artillery Regiment.

Other posts
Sultan Ismail Petra was the first Chancellor of Universiti Malaysia Kelantan and was appointed on 10 August 2008.

Marriage and children

Sultan Ismail Petra married Raja Perempuan Tengku Anis binti Tengku Abdul Hamid on 4 December 1968 when they both were aged 19 years old. The royal couple had four children:
 Tengku Muhammad Faris Petra (later Sultan Muhammad V), Sultan Kelantan (born 6 October 1969, photo). He married Tengku Zubaidah binti Tengku Norudin (née Kangsadal Pipitpakdee), a member of the Pattani royal family on 15 November 2004, and they divorced in 2008. He then married Sultanah Nur Diana Petra Abdullah (née Yana Yakubková), a Czech citizen on 30 October 2010. Later, he married Oksana Voevodina, a Russian model on 7 June 2018, and they divorced in 2019.
 Tengku Muhammad Faiz Petra, Tengku Mahkota Kelantan (born 20 January 1974, photo). He married Sofie Louise Johansson, a Swedish citizen on 19 April 2019.
 Tengku Muhammad Fakhry Petra, Tengku Bendahara Kelantan (born 7 April 1978, photo). He married Manohara Odelia Pinot, an Indonesian model on 26 August 2008, and they divorced in 2009.
 Tengku Amalin A’ishah Putri, Tengku Maharani Putri (born 26 June 1984, photo). She married Pengiran Muda Abdul Qawi ibni Pengiran Muda Mohamed Bolkiah, a member of the Bruneian royal family on 27 June 2013. They have four children:
 Pengiran Anak Tengku Afeefah Musyafaah Bolkiah Putri (born 13 April 2014)
 Pengiran Anak Tengku Azzahra Iffatul Bolkiah Putri (born 24 June 2016)
 Pengiran Anak Tengku Zaafirah Muizzah Bolkiah Putri (born 12 February 2020)
 Pengiran Anak Tengku Abdul Muhaimin (born 26 June 2022)

Sultan Ismail Petra also had a second wife, Cik Puan Elia Suhana Ahmad, whom he married on 23 December 2007.  It was reported that Sultan Ismail Petra, filed an application for verification of his divorce from his second wife, at the Syariah High Court on 9 March 2010.

Health issues
Sultan Ismail Petra suffered a massive stroke on 14 May 2009. He received follow-up treatments at the Universiti Sains Malaysia Hospital, Kubang Kerian. The Kelantan government then appointed medical specialists to form a medical panel to check his level of health. When Sultan Ismail Petra continued to be ill, the panel decided that he was not capable of ruling the state and it was decided that his eldest son, Crown Prince Tengku Muhammad Faris Petra be crowned the new sultan on 13 September 2010 by order of the Kelantan Succession Council. However, lawyers acting on behalf of Sultan Ismail Petra filed a petition to the Federal Court to have the appointment of the Crown Prince as the Sultan of Kelantan nullified, citing the appointment as unconstitutional.

Death and state funeral

Sultan Ismail Petra died on 28 September 2019 at 8:11 am at the Royal Ward Raja Perempuan Zainab II Hospital, Kota Bharu aged 69 because of heart failure. On that day, the Mentri Besar of Kelantan Dato' Ahmad Yakob officially announced his death.

On the same day, a state funeral was held. Among the royal family were present and other dignitaries were present to give their last respects is the Yang di-Pertuan Agong Al-Sultan Abdullah Ri’ayatuddin Al-Mustafa Billah Shah and the Raja Permaisuri Agong Tunku Azizah Aminah Maimunah Iskandariah, the Sultan of Brunei Sultan Hassanal Bolkiah, the Raja of Perlis Tuanku Syed Sirajuddin and the Raja Perempuan of Perlis Tuanku Fauziah, Deputy Prime Minister Dato' Seri Dr Wan Azizah Wan Ismail and her husband Dato' Seri Anwar Ibrahim. Also in attendance were the Tunku Aris Bendahara of Johor Tunku Abdul Majid (representing the Sultan of Johor) and the Tunku Besar of Seri Menanti Tunku Ali Redhauddin (representing the Yang di-Pertuan Besar of Negeri Sembilan). He was laid to rest near to grave of his late father, Sultan Yahya Petra at the Langgar Royal Mausoleum in Kota Bharu, Kelantan.

Recognitions

Places were named after him 
Several places were named after him, including:
Kolej Islam Antarabangsa Sultan Ismail Petra (KIAS) in Nilam Puri, Kelantan
Sekolah Menengah Kebangsaan Ismail Petra (1), a secondary school at Kompleks Sekolah-Sekolah Wakaf Mek Zainab in Kota Bharu, Kelantan
Sekolah Menengah Kebangsaan Ismail Petra (2), a secondary school in Kampung Telipot Kawasan Perindustrian Lundang, Kota Bharu, Kelantan
Sekolah Kebangsaan Ismail Petra (1), a primary school in Kompleks Sekolah-Sekolah Wakaf Mek Zainab, Kota Bharu, Kelantan 
Sekolah Kebangsaan Ismail Petra (2), a primary school in Jalan Long Yunus, Kota Bharu, Kelantan
Jalan Sultan Ismail Petra in Kelantan
Sultan Ismail Petra Bridge in Kota Bharu, Kelantan
Sultan Ismail Petra Silver Jubilee Mosque in Rantau Panjang, Kelantan
Al-Sultan Ismail Petra Mosque, Kubang Kerian, Kelantan
Sultan Ismail Petra Mosque, Kota Bharu, Kelantan
Ismail Petra Mosque, Tanah Merah, Kelantan
Al-Ismaili Mosque, Wakaf Bharu, Kelantan
Sultan Ismail Petra Islamic Silver Jubilee Complex, Panji, Kelantan
Sultan Ismail Petra Hospital in Kuala Krai, Kelantan
Sultan Ismail Petra Arch in Kota Bharu, Kelantan
Sultan Ismail Petra Shooting Range in Pengkalan Chepa, Kelantan

Issue

References

1949 births
2019 deaths
Ismail Petra
Dethroned monarchs
Malaysian people of Malay descent
Malaysian Muslims
People from Kota Bharu
Ismail Petra
20th-century Malaysian politicians
21st-century Malaysian politicians
Recipients of the Order of the Crown of the Realm